= Azucarron pineapple =

Type of pineapple

The azucarron pineapple (also known as an azucaron pineapple) is a very sweet pineapple found in Honduras and other parts of Central and South America. It is resistant to droughts and its fruit is conic.

== Description ==
Its standard weight is between 800 and 1,400 grams, its pulp color is an intense yellow, and it is very juicy.
